Pacheco Creek is a  waterway in central Contra Costa County, California. It empties into Suisun Bay. 

The creek has a run of chinook salmon and steelhead trout after periods of rain in the winter and fall.

History
Salvio Pacheco, a Californio ranchero and military officer, was granted the Rancho Monte del Diablo in 1834, and settled there in 1844. The creek is named for him.

See also
 List of watercourses in the San Francisco Bay Area

References

External links
 

Rivers of Contra Costa County, California
Rivers of Northern California
Tributaries of San Pablo Bay